Gabriel Gregorio Fernando José María García Moreno y Morán de Butrón (24 December 1821 – 6 August 1875), was an Ecuadorian politician and aristocrat who twice served as President of Ecuador (1861–65 and 1869–75) and was assassinated during his second term after being elected to a third. He is noted for his conservatism, Catholic religious perspective and rivalry with liberal strongman Eloy Alfaro. García Moreno was noted for efforts to economically and agriculturally advance Ecuador and for his staunch opposition to corruption.

Biography 
Gabriel Garcia Moreno was born in 1821, the son of Gabriel García-Yangüas y Gómez de Tama, a Spanish nobleman, and María de las Mercedes Moreno y Morán de Butrón, a member of a wealthy aristocratic criollo family, descended from the first Conquerors and Spanish nobility arrived to South America, in Ecuador's main port, Guayaquil. Garcia y Gomez de Tama, his father, initially had invested in the shipping industry of the Viceroyalty of Peru (then a Spanish colony encompassing what is now Peru, Ecuador, and Bolivia) who moved to the New World in order to see his investment yield results. He died, however, when Garcia Moreno was a boy, leaving his upbringing to his devoutly Catholic mother. This rearing instilled in the young Garcia Moreno a devout sense of Catholic piety which would influence his later political activity as well as his private life. Garcia Moreno studied theology and law in the University of Quito. Thinking he had a vocation to the priesthood, he received minor orders and the tonsure; but his closest friends and his own interests convinced him to pursue a secular career. Graduating in 1844, he was admitted to the bar. Starting his career as both lawyer and journalist (opposed to the Liberal government in power) he made little headway. In 1849, he embarked on a two-year visit to Europe to see first hand the effects of the 1848 revolution.

He returned home to find his country in the grip of strident anti-clericals; he was elected a senator and joined the opposition. Although himself a monarchist (like the first President Juan José Flores) who tried to establish a "United Kingdom of the Andes" with the French Emperor's backing, he bowed to circumstances and allowed himself to be made president after a civil war the year after his return---so great had his stint as a senator made his reputation. 
In 1861, his presidential position was confirmed in a popular election for a four-year term. His successor was deposed by the Liberals in 1867. But two years later he was reelected, and then again in 1875. During his period in office, he propelled his nation forward, all the while uniting him more closely to Catholicism.

Personally pious (he attended Mass daily, as well as visiting the Blessed Sacrament; he received Holy Communion every Sunday—a rare practice before Pope Pius X—and was active in a sodality), he made it one of the first duties of his government to promote and support Catholicism. Catholicism was the official religion of Ecuador, but by the terms of a new Concordat, the State's power over appointment of bishops inherited from Spain was eliminated at García Moreno's insistence. The 1869 constitution made Catholicism the religion of the State and required that both candidates and voters be Catholic. He was the only ruler in the world to protest the Pope's loss of the Papal States, and two years later had the legislature consecrate Ecuador to the Sacred Heart of Jesus.  One of his biographers writes that after this public consecration, he was marked for death by German freemasons.

García Moreno generated some animosity with his friendship toward the Society of Jesus (Jesuits).  During a period of exile, he helped some displaced Jesuits from Germany find refuge in Ecuador. He had also advocated legislation that would outlaw secret societies.

While the politics of his age were extremely convoluted and murky, that he was elected to a second term clearly indicates his popular appeal, both with the Catholic Church and with the masses.  His vigorous support of universal literacy and education based on the French model was both controversial and bold.

Through both his parents, García Moreno was descended from noble Spanish families whose lineages go back to the Middle Ages. His father, Gabriel García y Gómez de Tama was a Spaniard from Soria, descended from the house of the Dukes of Osuna, and an officer of the Spanish Royal Navy. García Moreno's mother was a member of a wealthy and prominent Spanish-Criollo aristocratic family descended from the Imperial family Komnenos, the house of the Dukes of Infantado and the first Conquerors and Spanish nobility arrived to South America. Her father was Count of Moreno and Governor-General of Guatemala, before moving to Guayaquil, where he was the Perpetual Military Governor. Among his other relatives were his first-cousins Juan Ignacio Moreno y Maisonnave, Archbishop of Toledo and Cardinal Primate of Spain, and his brothers Teodoro Moreno y Maisonnave, Count of Moreno and justice of the Spanish Supreme Court and Pedro Joaquín Moreno y Maisonnave, military historian and Chief Justice of the Royal Tribunal of the Military Orders of the Kingdom of Spain.

García Moreno founded the Conservative Party in 1869. He lived at the first Hacienda of Ecuador, the Hacienda Guachalá, leased from 1868 until near his death. García Moreno was assassinated while in office by Faustino Rayo, who attacked him using a machete. Other perpetrators  deployed firearms in the fatal ambush. Rayo was a former captain who had served under García Moreno.

Economic climate of Ecuador 
García Moreno came to the presidency of a country with an empty treasury and an enormous debt. To overcome this, he placed the government on stringent economy and abolished many positions, as well as cutting out the corruption which siphoned off tax money. As a result, he was able to provide Ecuadoreans with more for less.  This improved the financial status of the country and attracted foreign investment.

These public works projects were accomplished in part through the use of revenues obtained from the trabajo subsidario tax, a tax initially created to aid the funding of local works projects. The trabajo subsidario tax in many ways mirrored the colonial mita labor requirements demanded of Indians by Spaniards.  The voluntary contributions law and trabajo subsidario tax, revived in 1854, required that every citizen contribute four days of unpaid work to the State yearly or its monetary equivalent to promote the nation's public works projects. Like its mita precursor, the trabajo subsidario obligation fell most heavily on Ecuador's indigenous populations since these groups were unable to pay to avoid labor.  Estate-bound peons were able to find protection from these laws through the help of hacendado or essential paternal landlords.  In 1862, in a somewhat contentious move, García Moreno demanded control of these revenues of this tax in order to direct funds towards his ambitions for major infrastructural reform. This created a great deal of local discontent, as this meant diverting funds from more locally based public works projects.  Using these funds, García Moreno began his famous highway system project, contracting workers from the trabajo subsidario requirement to build these roads.

Although the ultimate results of the project are often praised, García Moreno has been criticized for his use of forced labor to build these highways and the overall discriminatory and abusive treatment of indigenous workers during the process of construction.  In his chronicle, Four years among the Ecuadorians, Friedrich Hassaurek describes witnessing the building of the road from Quito to Guayaquil.  He describes the "lamentable sight" of Indians laboring to build the roads without sufficient tools.  Hassurek writes, "[The Indian] does not work voluntarily, not even when paid for his labor, but is pressed into the service of the government for a length of time, at the expiration of which he is discharged and another forced into his place.  He works unwillingly, is kept to his task by the whip of the overseer.  It is evident that but little progress could be made under these circumstances."  Along with a variety of notable public works programs, García Moreno reformed the universities, established two polytechnic and agricultural colleges and a military school, and increased the number of primary schools from 200 to 500. The number of primary students grew from 8000 to 32,000.

Political climate and assassination

Liberals typically disapproved of García Moreno due to the authoritarian and ultraconservative nature of his rule and his utilization of secret police to silence leftist dissent. Some radicals viewed him as a dictator, and the liberals also were enraged that his policies remained after 1865 when his political allies were elected, and followed by his winning the presidency again in 1869. This opposition from the left compelled Juan Montalvo to write the pamphlet La dictadura perpetua (The Perpetual Dictatorship), which inspired the movement to assassinate Garcia Moreno. García Moreno, following his third election victory in 1875, wrote immediately to Pope Pius IX asking for his blessing before inauguration day on 30 August: 
I wish to obtain your blessing before that day, so that I may have the strength and light which I need so much in order to be unto the end a faithful son of our Redeemer, and a loyal and obedient servant of His Infallible Vicar. Now that the Masonic Lodges of the neighboring countries, instigated by Germany, are vomiting against me all sorts of atrocious insults and horrible calumnies, now that the Lodges are secretly arranging for my assassination, I have more need than ever of the divine protection so that I may live and die in defense of our holy religion and the beloved republic which I am called once more to rule.

García Moreno's prediction was correct; he was assassinated in the steps of the National Palace in Quito, struck down with knives and revolvers, his last words being: "" ("God does not die!").  Faustino Rayo assaulted him with several blows of a machete, while three or four others fired their revolvers.

On 5 August, shortly before his assassination, a priest visited García Moreno and warned him, "You have been warned that your death was decreed by the Freemasons; but you have not been told when. I have just heard that the assassins are going to try and carry out their plot at once.  For God's sake, take your measures accordingly!"  García Moreno replied that he had already received similar warnings and after calm reflection concluded that the only measure he could take was to prepare himself to appear before God.

Works

Gabriela Garcii Moreno - own works 

 Escritos y Discursos de Gabriel García Moreno (2 volumes), 1887-1888, Sociedad de la Juventud Católica de Quito,
 Cartas de Gabriel García Moreno (4 volumes), 1953-1955, Wilfrido Loor Moreira,

Non-fiction 

 García Moreno Président de L'Équateur Vengeur et Martyr du Droit Chrétien, 1887, Augusto Berthe,
 García Moreno, 1904, Juan León Mera,
 Gabriel García Moreno: regenerator of Ecuador, 1914, Maxwell-Scott,
 Un gran americano García Moreno, 1921, José Legohuir Raud,
 Gabriel García Moreno y El Ecuador de su Tiempo, 1941, Richard Pattee,
 García Moreno's Dream of a European Protectorate, 1942, William Spence Robertson,
 Vida de Don Gabriel García Moreno, 1942, Manuel Gálvez,
 Orígenes del Ecuador de Hoy, García Moreno, 1948, Luis Robalino Dávila,
 Vida de García Moreno (13 volumes), 1954-1981, Severo Gomezjurado,
 García Moreno, el Santo del patíbulo, 1959, Benjamín Carrión,
 García Moreno y sus asesinos, 1966, Wilfrido Loor Moreira,
 Por un García Moreno de cuerpo entero, 1978, Gabriel Cevallos García,
 García Moreno, 1984, Manuel M. Freire Heredia,
 Encuentro con la historia, García Moreno, líder católico de Latinoamérica, 2005, Francisco Salazar Alvarado,
 Gabriel García Moreno and Conservative State Formation in the Andes, 2008, Peter Henderson,
 "Dios no muere!" the life of Gabriel García Moreno, 2009, Maxwell-Scott,
 García Moreno, 2014, Hernán Rodríguez Castelo,
 García Moreno su proyecto político y su muerte, 2016, Enrique Ayala Mora,

Poems 

 El héroe mártir, canto a la memoria de García Moreno, 1876, Juan León Mera,
 Año jubilar del primer centenario del nacimiento del excelentísimo señor doctor Gabriel García Moreno (colección literaria), 1921,

Novels 

 Sé que vienen a matarme, 2001, Alicia Yánez Cossío,
 Expiación, 2012, Juan Ortiz García

Filmography 

 Sé que vienen a matarme, 2007, Film director - Carl West, Gabriel García Moreno - Jaime Bonelli

Legacy 
Pope Leo XIII wrote that Garcia Moreno "fell under the steel of the wicked for the Church."

On 20 December 1939, the beatification process was begun for Garcia Moreno, after Mgr. Polit, Archbishop of Quito, had previously examined the question of Garcia Moreno's martyrdom. In 1958, a prayer for the canonization of Garcia Moreno was issued as an indulgence, however, Garcia Moreno's process stalled soon after the Second Vatican Council. In 1974, Cardinal Vega replied to Hamish Fraser about the state of Garcia Moreno's process, who told him that "Unfortunately there is neither the religious nor political environment."

References

Further reading
 Vallette, Marc F. "Moreno: The Martyred President of Ecuador," Part II, The American Catholic Quarterly Review, Vol. XLVII, July/October 1922.

External links
 
 Official Website of the Ecuadorian Government about the history of the country's presidents
 Catholic Encyclopedia: Gabriel Garcia Moreno
 Christian Order: The Prophecy of Garcia Moreno's Presidency & Death

1821 births
1875 deaths
People from Guayaquil
Ecuadorian people of Spanish descent
Presidents of Ecuador
Conservative Party (Ecuador) politicians
Ecuadorian Ministers of Finance
Ecuadorian Roman Catholics
Catholicism and Freemasonry
1875 murders in South America
Deaths by firearm in Ecuador
Assassinated Ecuadorian politicians
Assassinated heads of state
Assassinated heads of government
People murdered in Ecuador
19th-century Ecuadorian people
Anti-Masonry
Freemasonry-related controversies
19th-century murders in Ecuador